Focke-Wulf Flugzeugbau AG was a German manufacturer of civil and military aircraft before and during World War II. Many of the company's successful fighter aircraft designs were slight modifications of the Focke-Wulf Fw 190. It is one of the predecessor companies of today's Airbus.

History
The company was founded in Bremen on 24 October 1923 as Bremer Flugzeugbau AG by Prof. Henrich Focke, Georg Wulf  and Dr. rer. pol. Werner Naumann. Almost immediately, they renamed the company Focke-Wulf Flugzeugbau AG (later Focke-Wulf Flugzeugbau GmbH).

Focke-Wulf merged, under government pressure, with Albatros Flugzeugwerke of Berlin in 1931. The Albatros Flugzeugwerke engineer and test pilot Kurt Tank became head of the technical department and started work on the Fw 44 Stieglitz (Goldfinch).

Dr Ludwig Roselius became Chairman in 1925 and handed over to his brother Friedrich in early 1933. In 1938 Roselius' HAG combine increased its shareholding to 46% and C. Lorenz AG secured 28%. The company was reconstituted as Focke-Wulf Flugzeugbau GmbH and no longer had to publish its accounts. A substantial capital injection occurred at this time.

In August 1933 Hans Holle and Rudolf Schubert were given power of attorney over the Berlin branch of Focke-Wulf. Then in October 1933, Focke-Wulf Flugzeugbau A.G. Albatros Berlin was officially registered with the Department of Trade.

Dr Roselius always remained the driving force of Focke-Wulf. He and his closest collaborator, Barbara Goette, often met with technical director Professor Kurt Tank. When Roselius died in May 1943, Heinrich Puvogel (later chair of Focke-Wulf) raised 4 million RM and continued handling the financial affairs of Focke-Wulf as chief of Seehandel A.G.

Hanna Reitsch demonstrated the Focke-Wulf Fw 61, the first fully controllable helicopter (as opposed to autogyro), in Berlin in 1938.<ref>Hanna Reitsch “Fliegen, mein Leben” on p. 180–198. Deutsche Verlags-Anstalt Stuttgart 1952</ref> The four-engined Fw 200 airliner flew nonstop between Berlin and New York City on August 10, 1938, making the journey in 24 hours and 56 minutes. It was the first aircraft to fly that route without stopping. The return trip on August 13, 1938, took 19 hours and 47 minutes. These flights are commemorated with a plaque in the Böttcherstraße street of Bremen.

The Fw 190 Würger (Shrike/butcher-bird), designed from 1938 on, and produced in quantity from early 1941–1945, was a mainstay single-seat fighter for the Luftwaffe during World War II.

Repeated bombing of Bremen in World War II resulted in the mass-production plants being moved to eastern Germany and General Government, with AGO Flugzeugwerke of Oschersleben as a major subcontractor for the Fw 190. Those plants used many foreign and forced labourers, and from 1944 also prisoners of war. Focke-Wulf's   plant at Marienburg produced approximately half of all Fw 190s and was bombed by the Eighth Air Force on October 9, 1943.

Many Focke-Wulf workers, including Kurt Tank, worked at the Instituto Aerotécnico in Córdoba, Argentina between 1947 and 1955. Others, like Henrich Focke, went to Brazil's Department of Aerospace Science and Technology, helping Brazil's effort to build Embraer. Focke-Wulf began to make gliders in 1951, and in 1955, motorised planes. Focke-Wulf, Weserflug and Hamburger Flugzeugbau joined forces in 1961 to form the Entwicklungsring Nord (ERNO) to develop rockets.
 
ITT Corporation, which had acquired a 25% stake in the company prior to the war, won $27 million in compensation in the 1960s for the damage that was inflicted on its share of the Focke-Wulf plant by WWII Allied bombing. Colonel Sosthenes Behn, Ludwig Roselius and Barbara Goette outfoxed Hitler in 1936 when he tried to have Roselius removed as a major stakeholder from Focke-Wulf A.G. and reconstitution followed resulting in the privatized company Focke-Wulf Flugzeugbau GmbH. Focke-Wulf formally merged with Weserflug in 1964, becoming Vereinigte Flugtechnische Werke (VFW), which after several further mergers became the European Aeronautic Defence and Space Company N.V. (EADS). EADS was later reorganised as Airbus.

In early 2021 Focke Wulf Aircraft was re-registered as a trademark across the EU, the UK and Australia as a retailer of aviation watches and associated official Focke Wulf merchandise.

Aircraft

Company designations
In alphabetical order:
 Focke-Wulf A 3
 Focke-Wulf A 4
 Focke-Wulf A 5
 Focke-Wulf A 6
 Focke-Wulf A 7
 Focke-Wulf A 16 – light transport aircraft, 1924. First design built by Focke-Wulf.
 Focke-Wulf A 17 Möwe (Gull) – 8-passenger airliner, 1927.
 Focke-Wulf A 20 Habicht (Hawk) – 4-passenger airliner, 1927.
 Focke-Wulf A 21 Photomöwe – aerial photography version of A 17, 1929.
 Focke-Wulf A 26 – engine testbed
 Focke-Wulf A 28 – re-engined A 20
 Focke-Wulf A 29 – production version of A 17, 1929.
 Focke-Wulf A 32 Bussard (Buzzard) – airliner, 1930.
 Focke-Wulf A 33 Sperber (Sparrowhawk) – 3-passenger airliner, 1930.
 Focke-Wulf A 36 Mastgans (Mast Goose) – mail plane, 1931.
 Focke-Wulf A 38 Möwe (Gull) – 10-passenger airliner, 1931.
 Focke-Wulf F 19 Ente (Duck) – experimental civil utility aircraft, 1927.
 Focke-Wulf GL 18 – light transport aircraft developed from the A 16, 1926.
 Focke-Wulf GL 22 – revised GL 18, 1927.
 Focke-Wulf K 23 Buchfink (Chaffinch) – two-seat reconnaissance aircraft, 1928.
 Focke-Wulf L 101 D Albatros Focke-Wulf S 1 – trainer, 1925.
 Focke-Wulf S 2 – two-seat trainer, 1928.
 Focke-Wulf S 24 Kiebitz (Lapwing) – sport aircraft, 1928.
 Focke-Wulf S 39
 Focke-Wulf S 48
 Focke-Wulf W 4 – reconnaissance floatplane, 1927.
 Focke-Wulf W 7 – maritime patrol biplane, 1932.

RLM designations
 Focke-Wulf Fw 40
 Focke-Wulf Fw 43 Falke (Falcon) – utility aircraft; known internally as A 43.
 Focke-Wulf Fw 44 Stieglitz (Goldfinch) – trainer (biplane), 1932.
 Focke-Wulf Fw 47 Höhengeier (Vulture) – weather aircraft; known internally as A 47.
 Focke-Wulf Fw 55 – biplane floatplane
 Focke-Wulf Fw 56 Stösser (Goshawk) – advanced trainer (parasol monoplane), 1933
 Focke-Wulf Fw 57 – twin-engined heavy fighter-bomber (prototype), 1935.
 Focke-Wulf Fw 58 Weihe (Kite) – transport/photo reconnaissance/weather research aircraft, 1937.
 Focke-Wulf Fw 61 – helicopter (prototype), 1936.
 Focke-Wulf Fw 62 – ship-borne reconnaissance (biplane seaplane), 1937.
 Focke-Wulf Ta 152 – interceptor/fighter (derived from Fw 190), 1944.
 Focke-Wulf Ta 154 Moskito (Mosquito) – night-fighter with wood structure like its British namesake, 1943.
 Focke-Wulf Fw 159 – fighter (prototype only), 1935.
 Focke-Wulf Fw 186 – autogiro reconnaissance aircraft (prototype), 1937.
 Focke-Wulf Fw 187 Falke (Falcon) – twin-engined two-seat heavy day fighter ("Zerstörer"), 1936.
 Focke-Wulf Fw 188 – reconnaissance aircraft (prototype), 1939.
 Focke-Wulf Fw 189 Uhu (Eagle Owl) – twin-engined, three-seat army cooperation/tactical reconnaissance, 1938.
 Focke-Wulf Fw 190 Würger (Shrike/butcher-bird) – single-seat fighter/interceptor, 1939
 Focke-Wulf Fw 191 – twin-engine Bomber B design competitor (prototype), 1942.
 Focke-Wulf Fw 200 Condor – four-engine airliner and maritime patrol-bomber, 1937.

Built under license
 Focke-Wulf C.20 – license-built (autogyro)
 Focke-Wulf C.30 Heuschrecke (Grasshopper) – license-built (autogyro)
 Focke-Wulf FWP.149D – license-built Piaggio P.149

Planned/unfinished designs
 Focke-Wulf Fw 42 – twin-engined medium bomber project developed from the F 19, 1929.
 Focke-Wulf Fw 160 – A design for a four-engined bomber with a twin-boom, unconnected tail.
 Focke-Wulf Ta 183 Huckebein – design for a jet-engined fighter, 1942.
 Focke-Wulf Fw 206 – planned commercial aircraft, 1940.
 Focke-Wulf Fw 238 – long-range bomber project (RLM airframe number 8-238 already used by Blohm und Voss)
 Focke-Wulf Fw 249 – large transport aircraft project; officially designated as Project 195.
 Focke-Wulf Fw 250 – twin-engine jet fighter project
 Focke-Wulf Fw 252 – single engine jet fighter
 Focke-Wulf Ta 254 – proposed version of the Ta 154 fighter.
 Focke-Wulf Fw 259 Frontjäger (concept)
 Focke-Wulf Fw 260 – 1960s VTOL airliner proposal
 Focke-Wulf Fw 261 – four-engine bomber/reconnaissance/U-Boat support aircraft project
 Focke-Wulf Ta 283 – interceptor fighter project
 Focke-Wulf Fw 300 – proposed long-range version of Fw 200, 1941-1942.
 Focke-Wulf Ta 400 – Amerikabomber'' design competitor, never built, 1943.
 Focke-Wulf Fw P.03.10206 – series of long-range strategic bomber projects, 1944.
 Focke-Wulf Fw P.03.10221-15 – large capacity strategic transport, 1941.
 Focke-Wulf Fw P.03.10025 – A 1944 design with a swept wing, a forward-swept V-tail, and two pusher propellers at the rear.
 Focke-Wulf Fw 03.10251 – series of jet-engined night and bad weather fighters 
 Focke-Wulf Fighter Project w/BMW803 – A 1941 design with a connected twin-boom tail, slightly swept-back wings, and two pusher propellers at the rear.

Projects
 Focke-Wulf 1000x1000x1000 – series of bomber designs, 1944.
 Focke-Wulf Project I – single-seat jet fighter, 1943.
 Focke-Wulf Project II
 Focke-Wulf Project III
 Focke-Wulf Project VII "Flitzer" – fighter project, 1944.
 Focke-Wulf Project VIII – turboprop powered fighter-bomber project, also designated Fw 281
 Focke Rochen – 1950s VTOL fighter project
 Focke-Wulf Super Lorin – Ramjet-rocket combo powered fighter
 Focke-Wulf Fw 354 Triebflügel – tail-sitter VTOL interceptor design
 Focke-Wulf TO Project
 Focke-Wulf Volksjäger – rocket-powered interceptor fighter project
 Focke-Wulf VTOL Project

See also
 Focke-Achgelis
 List of RLM aircraft designations

Notes

References

External links

List of Focke-Wulf aircraft
 

Defunct aircraft manufacturers of Germany
Defunct helicopter manufacturers of Germany
Manufacturing companies based in Bremen (state)
Companies based in Bremen
ITT Inc.
Companies involved in the Holocaust